The 1974 All-Ireland Minor Hurling Championship was the 44th staging of the All-Ireland Minor Hurling Championship since its establishment by the Gaelic Athletic Association in 1928. The championship began on 19 May 1974 and ended on 1 September 1974.

Kilkenny entered the championship as the defending champions.

On 1 September 1974, Cork won the championship following a 1-10 to 1-8 defeat of Kilkenny in the All-Ireland final. This was their 12th All-Ireland title overall and their first title since 1971.

Cork's Tadhg Murphy was the championship's top scorer with 4-24.

Results

Leinster Minor Hurling Championship

Quarter-finals

Semi-finals

Final

Munster Minor Hurling Championship

First round

Semi-finals

Finals

All-Ireland Minor Hurling Championship

Quarter-final

Semi-final

Final

Championship statistics

Top scorers

Top scorers overall

External links
 All-Ireland Minor Hurling Championship: Roll Of Honour

Minor
All-Ireland Minor Hurling Championship